Leonid Vasilevich Spirin (21 June 1932 – 23 February 1982) was a Russian athlete who competed for the Soviet Union. He was born in Zhavoronki.

He competed for the USSR in the 1956 Summer Olympics held in Melbourne, Australia in the 20 kilometer walk where he won the gold medal.

Spirin was awarded the Order of the Badge of Honor (1957).

References

External links
 
 
 
 

1932 births
1982 deaths
People from Odintsovsky District
Russian male racewalkers
Soviet male racewalkers
Olympic athletes of the Soviet Union
Olympic gold medalists for the Soviet Union
Athletes (track and field) at the 1956 Summer Olympics
European Athletics Championships medalists
World record setters in athletics (track and field)
Medalists at the 1956 Summer Olympics
Olympic gold medalists in athletics (track and field)
Sportspeople from Moscow Oblast